·Pimentel may refer to:

Localities
 Mariana Pimentel, municipality in Rio Grande do Sul, Brazil
 Mendes Pimentel, municipality in Minas Gerais, Brazil
 Pimentel, Dominican Republic, city in the Duarte province
 Pimentel, Sardinia, municipality in Cagliari, Italy
 Pimentel District, in Chiclayo, Peru

People
Pimentel (surname), including notable individuals with this name

Other
George C. Pimentel Award in Chemical Education
Palacio de Pimentel, royal palace in Castile and León

See also 
 Pimental, a surname
 Pimenta (disambiguation)